Takabara was a unit in the Persian Achaemenid army. They appear in some references related to the Greco-Persian wars, but little is known about them. According to Greek sources they were a tough type of peltasts. Takabara nevertheless were more garrison warriors than front line fighters as proved against the well-armed Hoplites of Greece where they were easily defeated in hand to hand conflict. They tended to fight with their own native weapons which would have included a crescent-shaped light wickerwork shield and a type of light-axe called the Sagaris as well as light linen cloth and leather. The Takabara were recruited from territories that incorporated modern Iraq and parts of Iran.

References

Military units and formations of the Achaemenid Empire